These are the results of the women's floor competition, one of six events for female competitors in artistic gymnastics at the 1976 Summer Olympics in Montreal.  The qualification and final rounds took place on July 18, 19, and 22nd at the Montreal Forum.

Results

Qualification

Eighty-six gymnasts competed in the compulsory and optional rounds on July 18 and 19.  The six highest scoring gymnasts advanced to the final on July 22.  Each country was limited to two competitors in the final.  Half of the points earned by each gymnast during both the compulsory and optional rounds carried over to the final.  This constitutes the "prelim" score.

Final

References
Official Olympic Report
www.gymnasticsresults.com
www.gymn-forum.net

Women's floor
1976 in women's gymnastics
Women's events at the 1976 Summer Olympics